René (born again or reborn in French) is a common first name in French-speaking, Spanish-speaking, and German-speaking countries. It derives from the Latin name Renatus. 

René is the masculine form of the name (Renée being the feminine form). In some non-Francophone countries, however, there exists the habit of giving the name René (sometimes spelled without an accent) to girls as well as boys. 
In addition, both forms are used as surnames (family names).

René as a first name given to boys in the United States reached its peaks in popularity in 1969 and 1983 when it ranked 256th. Since 1983 its popularity has steadily declined and it ranked 881st in 2016.
René as a first name given to girls in the United States reached its peak in popularity in 1962 when it ranked 306th. The last year for which René was ranked in the top 1000 names given to girls in the United States was 1988.

Persons with the given name
René, Duke of Anjou (1409–1480), titular king of Naples and Jerusalem
René II, Duke of Lorraine (1451–1508), grandson of René of Anjou
René I, Viscount of Rohan (1516–1552), warrior of the Italian War of 1551–1559
René II, Viscount of Rohan (1550–1586), his huguenot son
René Angélil (1942–2016), Canadian music producer and agent
Rene Aranda (born 1990), American actress
René Auberjonois (1940–2019), American actor
René Ballet (1928–2017), French journalist, novelist and essayist
René Barents (born 1951), Dutch judge and legal scholar
René Bernards (born 1953), Dutch oncologist
René Binder (born 1992), Austrian racing driver
Cardinal René de Birague (1505–1583)
Rene Bitorajac, Croatian actor
Rene Capo, Cuban-American judoka
René Chamussy (1936–2016), French-Lebanese Jesuit priest and academic administrator
René Coty, former president of France
René Descartes, French philosopher
Rene Farrait (born 1967), Puerto Rican singer, member of boy band Menudo
René Favaloro, Argentine cardiac surgeon
René Fonck, French aviator and most successful pilot in World War I
René Frégni (born 1947), French novelist
René de Froulay de Tessé (1648–1725), French marshal
Rene Gagnon, American World War II veteran, raised the American flag during the battle of Iwo Jima
René Goscinny (1926–1977), French comic book editor and writer
René Goupil (1608–1642), Canadian Catholic martyr and saint
René Guénon (1886–1951), French metaphysician and Sufi initiate
René Janssen (born 1959), Dutch nanotechnologist
Rene Kirby, American actor
René Kollo, German tenor
René Lamps (1915–2007), French politician
René Lépine, Canadian businessman and real estate developer
René Lévesque, Canadian journalist and politician, premier of Quebec
René Magritte, Belgian surrealist painter
René Marqués, Puerto Rican short story writer and playwright
René Mauriès (1921–1999), French journalist, reporter and writer
Rene Mederos, Cuban poster artist and graphic designer
Rene Medvešek, Croatian actor
René Mornex (1927–2022), French doctor and academic
René Muñoz (1938–2000), Cuban actor and scriptwriter
René Pape, German opera singer
Rene Plasencia, (born 1973) Florida House of Representatives member
René Juan Pérez Joglar (born 1978), known professionally as Residente, is a Puerto Rican rapper, writer and filmmaker
Rene Ranger (born 1986), New Zealand rugby player
René Rast (born 1986), German racing driver
René Reyes, American baseball player
René Robert, Canadian ice hockey player
René Prêtre, Swiss pediatric cardiovascular surgeon
René Reille (1835-1898), French soldier, industrialist, politician
René Rougeau (born 1986), American basketball player for Maccabi Haifa of the Israeli Basketball Premier League
René Rozet (1858–1939), French sculptor
Rene Russo, American actress 
René Simard, Canadian singer
René Steinke, German actor
René Thom, French mathematician
René Toribio (1912–1990), Guadeloupean politician
René Vydarený, Slovakian Ice Hockey Player
René Villa, Costa Rican singer

The name was also given to the French Cafe owner and war hero René Artois in popular British TV series 'Allo 'Allo.

Persons with this surname
Denise René (1919–2012), French art dealer
France-Albert René (1935–2019), second President of Seychelles
Lisa Rene (1978–1994), American murder victim
Mélanie René (born 1990), Swiss singer
Wendy Rene (1947–2014), American soul singer and songwriter

Variants in different languages
Renát Hungarian, Slovak
Renat Catalan, Polish
Renato Italian, Portuguese, Spanish
Renátus Slovak
Renatus Latin
René Czech, French, German, Slovak, Spanish, Dutch, Danish
Röné Hungarian
Ренат Russian

References

French masculine given names